Ali Mejbel Fartoos (born on 17 June 1982 in Iraq) is a Qatari footballer who currently plays as a striker . He is a member of the Qatar national football team.

Mejbel is originally Iraqi, his father being Mejbel Fartous, a defender with the Iraq national football team during the 1980s before becoming a senior Ba'ath party official.

External links 

Player profile - QSL.com.qa

References

1982 births
Living people
Qatari footballers
Qatar international footballers
2004 AFC Asian Cup players
Association football forwards
Iraqi footballers
Umm Salal SC players
Al-Rayyan SC players
Al-Wakrah SC players
Iraqi expatriate footballers
Al-Arabi SC (Qatar) players
Al-Sailiya SC players
Al-Shamal SC players
Al Bidda SC players
Naturalised citizens of Qatar
Iraqi emigrants to Qatar
Al-Markhiya SC players
Qatari people of Iraqi descent
Qatar Stars League players
Qatari Second Division players